is a Japanese  shōjo manga series by Reiko Okano. It won the 34th Shogakukan Manga Award for shōjo. It was adapted into a 1989 live action film directed by Masayuki Suo.

References

External links

1984 manga
1989 films
Live-action films based on manga
Films directed by Masayuki Suo
Winners of the Shogakukan Manga Award for shōjo manga
Shōjo manga
Manga adapted into films
Shogakukan manga
Buddhist comics
1980s Japanese films